Elloe is a sub-regional name in South Holland, Lincolnshire, England. It may refer to:

In Lincolnshire, England
 Elloe (wapentake), in Parts of Holland
 Elloe Stone, in Moulton, Lincolnshire
 Deanery of Elloe East, an administrative area of the Diocese of Lincoln
 Deanery of Elloe West, an administrative area of the Diocese of Lincoln
 East Elloe Rural District

Other uses
 Elloe Kaifi, a Marvel Comics character

See also
 Elloes, a petty sessional division in Lincolnshire
 Ello, a comune in Lecco, Lombardy, Italy